Stathmopoda masinissa, the persimmon fruit moth, is a moth of the family Stathmopodidae. The species was first described by Edward Meyrick in 1906. It is a serious pest on several persimmon species. It is found in several Old World countries Japan, Korea, Australia, Sri Lanka, Thailand and China.

Description
The caterpillars are internal borers which enter the fruit through the stalk or calyx. Host plants of the adults and caterpillars include several persimmon species such as Diospyros kaki, and also Amaranthus species.

References

External links
Sex pheromone of the persimmon fruit moth, Stathmopoda masinissa: identification and laboratory bioassay of (4E, 6Z)-4,6-hexadecadien-1-ol derivatives.
Mating behavior of the persimmon fruit moth, Stathmopoda masinissa Meyrick
The biology and control of the persimmon fruit moth, Stathmopoda massinissa
Synthesis and Characterization of Hexadecadienyl Compounds with a Conjugated Diene System, Sex Pheromone of the Persimmon Fruit Moth and Related Compounds
Semiochemicals of Stathmopoda masinissa, the Persimmon fruit moth
Oviposition and Development of the Persimmon Fruit Moth, Stathmopoda masinissa

Moths of Asia
Moths described in 1906
Stathmopodidae